Aleida Nuñez (born Aleida Araceli Nuñez Flores on January 24, 1981) is a Mexican actress, singer and model.

Early years 
She was a pageant queen in various regional contests during her adolescence. In 1994 she won the second place in the contest Nuestra Belleza Guanajuato. She began her career in media communications as a conductor in various programs on channel 10 of León. She was also a runway and advertisement model before beginning her career in acting.

Personal life
Aleida Nuñez has a sister named Marcela. In 2009, she married Pablo Glogovsky and gave birth to a boy named Alexander in 2013.

Filmography

Telenovelas

Series

References

External links 

Official Site of Aleida Nuñez
Video de Aleida Núñez

1975 births
Living people
Mexican telenovela actresses
Mexican television actresses
Mexican female models
Actresses from Jalisco
Singers from Jalisco
21st-century Mexican actresses
People from Lagos de Moreno, Jalisco
21st-century Mexican singers
21st-century Mexican women singers